Camalaniugan, officially the Municipality of Camalaniugan, is a 4th class municipality in the province of Cagayan, Philippines. According to the 2020 census, it has a population of 25,236 people.

Etymology 
The town was named after the "malaniug" trees which grew in abundance during the early years.
In Fr. Jose Bugarin's Ibanag dictionary "malaniug, a wild palm...Camalaniugan, place where there are many of these [also] a town in this province."

History 
Camalaniugan was founded on June 15, 1596, a rather early date because of its proximity to Nueva Segovia (Lallo). San Jacinto de Polonia was selected as their patron saint. The early settlers were the Ybanags and Ilocanos, both peace-loving citizens. They built their houses along the banks of the Cagayan River. They brought with them their knowledge of farming and skills in making weapons. According to the story related by the elders, among these "happy" settlers was Guiab, a famous strongman and leader of Camalaniugan. He did not like the missionaries. Because of this, he was arrested and later hanged from a malaniug tree by order of Juan Pablo Carreon. For years the people suffered injustice.

Between 1887 and 1888, Fray Marcelino Cascos, O.P., built a convent. It was in this convent where Col. Daniel Tirona billeted his men after arresting the missionaries when he occupied the town in 1898.

It is in this town where the oldest Christian bell in the Far East is located. It is also the birthplace of Don Vicente Nepomuceno, author of the history book "Historia Nac Cagayan" which is written in Ybanag.

The town has a church dedicated to San Jacinto or Saint Hyacinth which houses the oldest church bell (Sancta Maria, 1595) in the far east.

Geography

Barangays
Camalaniugan is politically subdivided into 28 barangays. These barangays are headed by elected officials: Barangay Captain, Barangay Council, whose members are called Barangay Councilors. All are elected every three years.

Climate

Demographics

Economy

Government
Camalaniugan, belonging to the first legislative district of the province of Cagayan, is governed by a mayor designated as its local chief executive and by a municipal council as its legislative body in accordance with the Local Government Code. The mayor, vice mayor, and the councilors are elected directly by the people through an election which is being held every three years.

Elected officials

Education
The Schools Division of Cagayan governs the town's public education system. The division office is a field office of the DepEd in Cagayan Valley region. The office governs the public and private elementary and public and private high schools throughout the municipality.

 Camalaniugan National High School

References

External links

Camalaniugan Blog
[ Philippine Standard Geographic Code]
Philippine Census Information

Municipalities of Cagayan
Populated places on the Rio Grande de Cagayan